Paul Adrien Bourdaloue (4 January 1798, Bourges - 21 June 1868, Bourges) was a French civil engineer and topographer, who proposed the first orthometric levelling of France.

Life
Head of the Corps des Ponts et Chaussées, then engineer-resident of the Chemins de fer du Gard, from 1847 he carried out the levelling of the area of the future Suez Canal in Egypt at the request of the engineer Linant de Bellefonds. During this process he and others noted that the difference in levels between the Mediterranean and Red Sea was negligible, contrary to the conclusions of Bonaparte's engineers on the Egyptian Expedition such as Jacques-Marie Le Père.

In 1857, he was commissioned to move onto the general levelling of mainland France. From 1857 to 1863, he laid out a network of 15,000 iron seals across France, providing the country's first level-lines.

He was maire-adjoint of the town of Bourges. In 1865, he entrusted to the architect Albert Tissandier the design of a château d'eau at Séraucourt, still visible. He is buried in the cimetière des Capucins at Bourges.

Works 
Nivellement général de la France (1864, several volumes in-8°), ed.  Pigelet, Bourges

1798 births
1868 deaths
French civil engineers
People from Bourges
French topographers